Nino Salukvadze (born 1 February 1969, in Tbilisi) is a female Georgian sport shooter. She is a nine-time Olympian and has won medals on three occasions. At age 19 and competing for the Soviet Union at the 1988 Summer Olympics, she won a gold medal in the women's 25-metre sporting pistol competition and silver in the women's 10-metre air pistol competition. At the 2008 Summer Olympics, competing for Georgia, she added to her tally with a bronze medal, also in the 10-metre air pistol event.

1988 Summer Olympics 
Competing in the 1988 Summer Olympics in Seoul, Korea, Nino set the world record and won a gold medal in the 25-meter pistol for the Soviet Union. She also won the silver medal in the 10-meter air pistol.

2008 Summer Olympics
Georgia and Russia were at war when Salukvadze competed in the women's 10-metre air pistol competition of the 2008 Summer Olympics with Russian shooter Natalia Paderina. After Salukvadze won the bronze and Paderina the silver, they shared a podium, hugged and shook hands, which was seen a peaceful gesture.

2016 Summer Olympics 
At the 2016 Summer Olympics, Nino and her son Tsotne Machavariani were the first mother-son duo to compete in the same Olympics, representing Georgia in the pistol events.

2020 Summer Olympics 
At age 52, Nino competed in her ninth Olympic Games at the 2020 Summer Olympics, becoming the first female athlete in history to do so. And ahead of her record-breaking appearance, Salukvadze was given the honor of being one of Georgia's flag bearers for the 2020 Summer Olympics Opening Ceremony, for the second time.

Olympic results

Records

See also
 List of athletes with the most appearances at Olympic Games

References

External links
 
 
 

1969 births
Living people
Female sport shooters from Georgia (country)
Soviet female sport shooters
ISSF pistol shooters
World record holders in shooting
Olympic shooters of Georgia (country)
Olympic shooters of the Unified Team
Olympic shooters of the Soviet Union
Shooters at the 1988 Summer Olympics
Shooters at the 1992 Summer Olympics
Shooters at the 1996 Summer Olympics
Shooters at the 2000 Summer Olympics
Shooters at the 2004 Summer Olympics
Shooters at the 2008 Summer Olympics
Shooters at the 2012 Summer Olympics
Shooters at the 2016 Summer Olympics
Shooters at the 2020 Summer Olympics
Olympic gold medalists for the Soviet Union
Olympic silver medalists for the Soviet Union
Olympic bronze medalists for Georgia (country)
Sportspeople from Tbilisi
Olympic medalists in shooting
European Games medalists in shooting
European Games bronze medalists for Georgia (country)
Medalists at the 2008 Summer Olympics
Shooters at the 2015 European Games
Shooters at the 2019 European Games
Medalists at the 1988 Summer Olympics
Recipients of the Presidential Order of Excellence